Dieter Wolfgang Büttner (born 24 February 1949) as a retired West German hurdler who competed in the 400 m event at the 1972 Summer Olympics. In the semifinals he tumbled over Christian Rudolph, who had obstructed his path. The West German team launched a protest, but it was rejected because Büttner had no chance to reach the final anyway. Büttner held the German 400 m title in 1971 and 1972. After retiring from competitions he worked as a teacher of physical education, geography and Evangelicalism.

References

West German male hurdlers
1949 births
Living people
Olympic athletes of West Germany
Athletes (track and field) at the 1972 Summer Olympics
People from Celle
Sportspeople from Lower Saxony